The Lions–Packers rivalry is an NFL rivalry between the Detroit Lions and Green Bay Packers. They first met in 1930 when the Lions were known as the Portsmouth Spartans and based in Portsmouth, Ohio. The team eventually moved to Detroit for the 1934 season.

The Lions and Packers have been division rivals since 1933, having both played in the NFL's Western Conference from 1933 to 1970 and in the NFC North since 1970 (known as the NFC Central from 1970 to 2001). They have met at least twice a season since 1932, without any cancelled games. This is therefore the longest continuously-running rivalry in the NFL.

Green Bay is one of four teams with a winning record against all of their divisional opponents with 100-plus head-to-head games played (along with the Dallas Cowboys, Kansas City Chiefs, and the Miami Dolphins).  Detroit is one of only three teams with a losing record against all of their divisional opponents with 100-plus head-to-head games played (along with the Los Angeles Chargers and New York Jets).  This holds true as of the end of the 2022 season.

The rivalry is particularly important to football fans in the state of Michigan, and particularly the Upper Peninsula. Fans from the west of the peninsula tend to root for the Packers, whereas fans from the east of the peninsula, as well as the rest of Michigan's Lower Peninsula, tend to root for the Lions. Because of this, within Michigan, the rivalry is often known as the Yooper Bowl.

Notable moments and games
Packers 50, Lions 7 (November 24, 1940) – In the most lopsided game in the rivalry's history the Packers raced out to a 43–0 lead and would eventually prevail 50–7. The win moved the Packers to 6-4 and dropped the Lions to 5–5–1.
Packers 57, Lions 21 (October 7, 1945) – The Packers set (and still hold) an NFL record by scoring 41 points in a single quarter. The Lions led 7-0 in the 2nd quarter before the Packers scored six consecutive touchdowns, including four receiving touchdowns by Don Hutson. The four touchdown receptions in a single quarter is an NFL record that still stands today. Don Hutson also made five of his six extra point attempts in the quarter to give him 29 points for the quarter in total, which is also an NFL record.
Lions 26, Packers 14 (November 22, 1962) – The Packers entered the game 10–0 and in first place in the Western Conference. The Lions were second at 8–2. The Lions jumped out to a 23–0 halftime lead and extended the lead to 26–0 before the Packers scored two late touchdowns. The Lions defense pounded Packers quarterback Bart Starr with 11 sacks. The game was played in Detroit on Thanksgiving and pulled the Lions within one game of the division lead with three weeks left in the season. The game would be dubbed the "Thanksgiving Day Massacre" thanks to the dominant performance by the Lions defense. The Lions and Packers both won their next two games, but in the final week of the season, the Lions lost to the Chicago Bears, while the Packers defeated the Los Angeles Rams en route to a 13–1 season. The Packers went on to defeat the Giants for their eighth NFL championship.
Lions 21, Packers 17 (December 15, 1991) – The Lions staved off a last minute comeback attempt by the Packers offense led by quarterback Mike Tomczak to wrap up a four-point victory over the Packers at Lambeau Field.  The game was the last time the Lions defeated the Packers in the state of Wisconsin until 2015, as the Packers held a 24-game home winning streak in the series. That season would also be the last time that Detroit swept Green Bay until 2017.
Packers 28, Lions 24 (January 8, 1994) – This was the first ever playoff meeting between these two teams. In week 17 the Lions defeated the Packers 30–20 giving them home field advantage for this game. With Green Bay trailing 24–21 late in the game Brett Favre hit Sterling Sharpe for a 40-yard touchdown pass with 55 seconds left, giving Green Bay the lead and ultimately the win. This was the first time the Lions had ever lost a home playoff game, and remains their last home playoff game to date.
Packers 16, Lions 12 (December 31, 1994) – For the second consecutive season the Packers and Lions met in the playoffs, this time at Lambeau Field. The Packers held Barry Sanders to -1 yards rushing and the Lions to -4 yards rushing overall.  The Packers never trailed as they led 10–0 at half time and only allowed 10 points in the second half before intentionally committing a safety on the last play of the game to run out the clock. This was the Packers' first victory at Lambeau Field against the Lions since 1985 (though they beat the Lions in all four Milwaukee games against them during that time).
Packers 31, Lions 21 (December 28, 2008) – The Packers defeated the Lions in Week 17. With the loss, the Lions became the first team in NFL history to go 0–16 season in a 16-game season.
Lions 7, Packers 3 (December 12, 2010) – Aaron Rodgers was knocked out of the game before the half and missed the rest of the game as well as the Packers next game against the Patriots. Matt Flynn led the Packers to a field goal that gave them a 3–0 lead in the 3rd quarter. The Lions scored a touchdown in the 4th quarter and won 7–3. This forced the Packers to win their final two games of the season to make the playoffs. They did so and won Super Bowl XLV.
Packers 45, Lions 41 (January 1, 2012) – With the Packers having already clinched home field advantage in the playoffs, backup quarterback Matt Flynn started in place of Aaron Rodgers and went on to throw a team record six touchdown passes in a shootout victory over the Lions at Lambeau Field. This is the highest scoring game between both rivals at 86 points, and the first time both teams met after each one accumulated at least 10 regular season victories.

Packers 30, Lions 20 (December 28, 2014) – The Packers and Lions entered this Week 17 match up with identical 11–4 records. Therefore, this game was for the 2014 NFC North Division Championship. Green Bay jumped out to a 14–0 lead before Aaron Rodgers left the game after re-injuring his calf. Rodgers would return in the second half after the Lions had tied the game at 14. The Packers ended up scoring a pair of touchdowns and forcing a safety before the Lions scored a late touchdown. Both teams would make the playoffs as the win gave the Packers their fourth straight division championship while the Lions ended up as a Wild Card team.
Packers home winning streak (1992–2014) – The Lions had not beaten the Packers in a road game from 1992–2014. With Green Bay's 30–20 win over Detroit on December 28, 2014, the Packers had defeated the Lions in the state of Wisconsin 24 straight times, including a Wild Card Playoff game on December 31, 1994. The last Lions victory before the streak began in Wisconsin was a 21–17 win on December 15, 1991. The Lions ended the streak with an 18–16 victory on November 15, 2015.
Lions 18, Packers 16 (November 15, 2015) – Matt Prater missed two extra-point attempts, including one late in the fourth quarter. With Green Bay trailing 18–10 late in the fourth quarter, the Packers scored a touchdown on the ensuing drive, to trim the Lions lead to 18–16, and failed on the two-point conversion, but then recovered the onside kick when Calvin Johnson couldn't secure the ball with 31 seconds left. Mason Crosby's 52-yard attempt on the game's final play was muffed, giving the Lions their first win in Green Bay since 1991.
Packers 27, Lions 23 (December 3, 2015) – In the largest comeback in series history, the Packers overcame a 20-point deficit to win the game 27–23. The Lions appeared to have won the game 23–21, but a facemask penalty was called against them as time expired. Since NFL games cannot end on a defensive penalty even if time has expired, an untimed play was given to the Packers. On the final play, Aaron Rodgers completed a 61-yard Hail Mary pass to tight end Richard Rodgers II. The Packers then took a knee on the extra point. With the win, the Packers avoided what would have been their first series sweep by the Lions since 1991. This was the longest game-winning, game-ending Hail Mary in NFL history. The game would be dubbed the Miracle in Motown shortly thereafter.
Packers 31, Lions 24 (January 1, 2017) – For the second time in three seasons the Packers and Lions met in week 17 for the NFC North Division Title. The Packers and Lions both entered the game with a 9–6 record. Due to an earlier Redskins loss, both teams had clinched a playoff spot before kickoff. The Lions led 14–10 at the half but the Packers went on a 21–3 scoring run on three Aaron Rodgers touchdown passes and appeared to put the game away. However, Matthew Stafford hit Anquan Boldin in desperation for a 35-yard touchdown pass with 13 seconds left and forced an onside kick attempt. The Packers recovered and held on to win their fifth division championship in six years.
Lions 31, Packers 0 (December 30, 2018) – The Lions shutout the Packers for the first time since 1973 and at Lambeau Field for the first time since 1970.  The Lions also swept the Packers for the second consecutive season.  Aaron Rodgers got knocked out early in the game with a concussion, forcing backup quarterback DeShone Kizer to play most of the game. Lions kicker Matt Prater threw a touchdown pass to tight end Levine Toilolo and cornerback Quandre Diggs sealed the game with an interception of Kizer with five minutes left to play.
Packers 23, Lions 22 (October 14, 2019) – This Monday Night Football game at Lambeau Field was close all the way, as the Packers committed multiple turnovers in a game where the Lions offense struggled. The Packers did not win the game until the last second where kicker Mason Crosby made a game-winning field goal. However, the game was criticized for poor officiating. Two highly questionable hands to the face penalties on Lions defensive end Trey Flowers extended two Packers scoring drives in the 4th quarter, causing outrage from fans and the media.
Lions 20, Packers 16 (January 8, 2023) – On this edition of Sunday Night Football, the Lions and Packers faced off at Lambeau Field, with the Packers needing a victory to clinch the last playoff spot in the NFC. After a 9–6 halftime deficit, the Lions rebounded to a 20–16 victory to stun the Packers and knock them out of the playoffs. The game was characterized by two costly Packers turnovers and several missed opportunities. With the loss, the Packers fell to an 8–9 record, giving them their third losing season in seven years.

Summary of results

Game results

|-
| 
| style="| 
| Tie  6–6
| style="| Packers  47–13
| Packers  1–0–1
| Portsmoth Spartans began play in 1930.  Packers win 1930 NFL Championship.
|-
| 
| Tie 1–1
| style="| Spartans  19–0
| style="| Packers  15–10
| Packers  2–1–1
| 
|-
| 
| Tie 1–1
| style="| Spartans  7–0
| style="| Packers  17–0
| Packers  3–2–1
| 
|-
| 
| Tie 1–1
| style="| Packers  3–0
| style="| Lions  3–0
| Packers  4–3–1
| Spartans move to Detroit and become the Lions. 
|-
|rowspan="2"| 
|rowspan="2" style="| 
| style="| Lions  20–10
| style="| Packers  13–9
|rowspan="2"|  Packers  6–4–1
|rowspan="2"|  Would be the only time both teams met three times in the regular season. Packers hosted two games against the Lions (One in Green Bay and one in Milwaukee). Lions win 1935 NFL Championship.
|-
|
| style="| Packers  14–2 †
|-
| 
| style="| 
| style="| Packers  26–17
| style="| Packers  20–18
| Packers  8–4–1
| Packers win 1936 NFL Championship.
|-
| 
| style="| 
| style="| Packers  24–13
| style="| Packers  26–6
| Packers  10–4–1
|
|-
| 
| Tie 1–1
| style="| Packers  28–7
| style="| Lions  17–7
| Packers  11–5–1
| Packers lose 1938 NFL Championship.
|-
| 
| style="| 
| style="| Packers  12–7
| style="| Packers  26–7
| Packers  13–5–1
| Packers win 1939 NFL Championship.
|-
|colspan="6"| † Denotes a Packers home game played in Milwaukee
|-

|-
| 
| Tie 1–1
| style="| Packers  50–7
| style="| Lions  23–14
| Packers  14–6–1
| Packers' 50–7 win is the largest margin of victory by either team in the series.
|-
| 
| style="| 
| style="| Packers  24–7
| style="| Packers  23–0
| Packers  16–6–1
| Lions move to Tiger Stadium. 
|-
| 
| style="| 
| style="| Packers  28–7
| style="| Packers  38–7 †
| Packers  18–6–1
| 
|-
| 
| style="| 
| style="| Packers  27–6
| style="| Packers  35–14
| Packers  20–6–1
| 
|-
| 
| style="| 
| style="| Packers  27–6
| style="| Packers  35–14 †
| Packers  22–6–1
| Packers win 9 straight meetings in Detroit (1936–44), 1944 NFL Championship.
|-
| 
| Tie 1–1
| style="| Lions  14–3
| style="| Packers  57–21 †
| Packers  23–7–1
| Packers win 10 straight meetings (1940–45).
|-
| 
| style="| 
| style="| Packers  9–0
| style="| Packers  10–7 †
| Packers  25–7–1
| 
|-
| 
| style="| 
| style="| Packers  35–14
| style="| Packers  34–17
| Packers  27–7–1
| 
|-
| 
| Tie 1–1
| style="| Lions  24–20
| style="| Packers  33–21
| Packers  28–8–1
| 
|-
| 
| Tie 1–1
| style="| Lions  21–7
| style="| Packers  16–14 †
| Packers  29–9–1
| Packers win 9 straight home meetings (1941–49).
|-
|colspan="6"| † Denotes a Packers home game played in Milwaukee
|-

|-
| 
| style="| 
| style="| Lions  24–21
| style="| Lions  45–7
| Packers  29–11–1
| Lions' first series sweep in the 21-year history of the rivalry.
|-
| 
| style="| 
| style="| Lions  52–35
| style="| Lions  24–17
| Packers  29–13–1
| 
|-
| 
| style="| 
| style="| Lions  48–24
| style="| Lions  52–17
| Packers  29–15–1
| Lions win 1952 NFL Championship.
|-
| 
| style="| 
| style="| Lions  34–15
| style="| Lions  14–7
| Packers  29–17–1
| Lions win 1953 NFL Championship.
|-
| 
| style="| 
| style="| Lions  28–24
| style="| Lions  21–17
| Packers  29–19–1
| Lions win 10 straight meetings (1950–54).  Lions lose 1954 NFL Championship.
|-
| 
| Tie 1–1
| style="| Lions  24–10
| style="| Packers  20–17
| Packers  30–20–1
| 
|-
| 
| Tie 1–1
| style="| Packers  24–20
| style="| Lions  20–10
| Packers  31–21–1
| 
|-
| 
| style="| 
| style="| Lions  18–6
| style="| Lions  24–14
| Packers  31–23–1
| Packers open Lambeau Field.  Lions win 1957 NFL Championship.
|-
| 
| style="| 
| style="| Lions  24–14
| Tie  13–13
| Packers  31–24–2 
| 
|-
| 
| style="| 
| style="| Packers  24–17
| style="| Packers  28–10
| Packers  33–24–2 
| 
|-

|-
| 
| Tie 1–1
| style="| Lions  23–10
| style="| Packers  28–9
| Packers  34–25–2
| 
|-
| 
| Tie 1–1
| style="| Packers  17–9
| style="| Lions  17–13 †
| Packers  35–26–2
| Packers win 1961 NFL Championship.
|-
| 
| Tie 1–1
| style="| Lions  26–14
| style="| Packers  9–7
| Packers  36–27–2
| Packers win 1962 NFL Championship.
|-
| 
| style="| 
| Tie  13–13
| style="| Packers  31–10 †
| Packers  37–27–3 
|
|-
| 
| style="| 
| style="| Packers  14–10
| style="| Packers  30–7
| Packers  39–27–3 
| 
|-
| 
| Tie 1–1
| style="| Packers  31–21
| style="| Lions  12–7 
| Packers  40–28–3
| Packers win 1965 NFL Championship.
|-
| 
| style="| 
| style="| Packers  31–7
| style="| Packers  23–14
| Packers  42–28–3 
| Packers win 1966 NFL Championship and Super Bowl I.
|-
| 
| style="| 
| style="| Packers  21–17
| Tie  17–17
| Packers  43–28–4 
| Packers win 1967 NFL Championship and Super Bowl II.
|-
| 
| style="| 
| Tie  14–14
| style="| Lions  23–17
| Packers  43–29–5 
| 
|-
| 
| Tie 1–1
| style="| Packers  28–17
| style="| Lions  16–10
| Packers  44–30–5 
| 
|-
|colspan="6"| † Denotes a Packers home game played in Milwaukee
|-

|-
| 
| style="| 
| style="| Lions  20–0
| style="| Lions  40–0
| Packers  44–32–5 
| Both teams placed in the NFC Central after AFL-NFL merger.
|-
| 
| style="| 
| style="| Lions  31–28
| Tie  14–14 †
| Packers  44–33–6 
|  
|-
| 
| style="| 
| style="| Packers  24–23
| style="| Packers  33–7
| Packers  46–33–6 
| 
|-
| 
| style="| 
| style="| Lions  34–0
| Tie  13–13
| Packers  46–34–7 
| 
|-
| 
| Tie 1–1
| style="| Lions  19–17
| style="| Packers  21–19 †
| Packers  47–35–7 
| 
|-
| 
| style="| 
| style="| Lions  13–10
| style="| Lions  30–16
| Packers  47–37–7 
| Lions open Pontiac Silverdome.
|-
| 
| Tie 1–1
| style="| Lions  27–6
| style="| Packers  24–14
| Packers  48–38–7 
|
|-
| 
| Tie 1–1
| style="| Lions  10–6
| style="| Packers  10–9
| Packers  49–39–7 
| 
|-
| 
| style="| 
| style="| Packers  13–7
| style="| Packers  35–14 †
| Packers  51–39–7 
| 
|-
| 
| style="| 
| style="| Packers  18–13
| style="| Packers  24–16 †
| Packers  53–39–7 
| 
|-
|colspan="6"| † Denotes a Packers home game played in Milwaukee
|-

|-
| 
| style="| 
| style="| Lions  24–3
| style="| Lions  29–7 †
| Packers  53–41–7 
| 
|-
| 
| Tie 1–1
| style="| Lions  31–27
| style="| Packers  31–17
| Packers  54–42–7 
|
|-
| 
| style="| 
| style="| Lions  27–24
| style="| Lions  17–10
| Packers  54–44–7 
| Both games played despite players strike reducing the season to 9 games.
|-
| 
| style="| 
| style="| Lions  38–14
| style="| Lions  23–20(OT) †
| Packers  54–46–7  
| 
|-
| 
| Tie 1–1
| style="| Lions  31–28
| style="| Packers  41–9
| Packers  55–47–7 
| 
|-
| 
| style="| 
| style="| Packers  26–23
| style="| Packers  43–10 
| Packers  57–47–7 
|
|-
| 
| Tie 1–1
| style="| Packers  44–40
| style="| Lions  21–14
| Packers  58–48–7  
| 
|-
| 
| Tie 1–1
| style="| Packers  34–33
| style="| Lions  19–16(OT)
| Packers  59–49–7  
| 
|-
| 
| style="| 
| style="| Lions  30–14
| style="| Lions  19–9
| Packers  59–51–7  
| 
|-
| 
| Tie 1–1
| style="| Lions  31–22
| style="| Packers  23–20(OT) †
| Packers  60–52–7 
| 
|-
|colspan="6"| † Denotes a Packers home game played in Milwaukee
|-

|-
| 
| Tie 1–1
| style="| Packers  24–21
| style="| Lions  24–17
| Packers  61–53–7  
| 
|-
| 
| style="| 
| style="| Lions  23–14
| style="| Lions  21–17
| Packers  61–55–7  
| With the win in Green Bay, the Lions compress the Packers’ lead in the all-time series to 6; the smallest it has been since 1938.
|-
| 
| style="| 
| style="| Packers  27–13
| style="| Packers  38–10 †
| Packers  63–55–7 
| 
|-
| 
| Tie 1–1
| style="| Lions  30–20
| style="| Packers  26–17 †
| Packers  64–56–7 
| Lions' win in Week 18 meeting in Detroit to earn home home-field advantage for the rematch in the NFC Wild Card Round the following week.
|- style="font-weight:bold;background:#f2f2f2;"
| 1993 Playoffs
| style="| 
| style="| Packers  28–24
|
| Packers  65–56–7
| NFC Wild Card Round.  Packers win on last-minute touchdown pass from Brett Favre to Sterling Sharpe. This to date marks the last home playoff game for the Lions.
|-
| 
| Tie 1–1
| style="| Lions  34–31
| style="| Packers  38–30 †
| Packers  66–57–7
| The Lions and Packers played each other five times during the 1994 calendar year (Week 18 of the 1993 season, a 1993 postseason game, two 1994 regular season games, and a 1994 postseason game).  This is the only time in NFL history two teams have played five times in a calendar year.
|- style="font-weight:bold;background:#f2f2f2;"
| 1994 Playoffs
| style="| 
|
| style="| Packers  16–12
| Packers  67–57–7
| NFC Wild Card Round. Lions' running back Barry Sanders held to –1 rushing yards.
|-
| 
| Tie 1–1
| style="| Lions  24–16
| style="| Packers  30–21
| Packers  68–58–7 
| 
|-
| 
| style="| 
| style="| Packers  31–3
| style="| Packers  28–18
| Packers  70–58–7 
| Packers win Super Bowl XXXI.
|-
| 
| Tie 1–1
| style="| Lions  26–15
| style="| Packers  20–10
| Packers  71–59–7  
| Packers lose Super Bowl XXXII.
|-
| 
| Tie 1–1
| style="| Lions  27–20
| style="| Packers  38–19
| Packers  72–60–7 
| 
|-
| 
| Tie 1–1
| style="| Lions  23–15
| style="| Packers  26–17
| Packers  73–61–7 
| 
|-
|colspan="6"| † Denotes a Packers home game played in Milwaukee
|-

|-
| 
| Tie 1–1
| style="| Lions  39–24
| style="| Packers  26–13
| Packers  74–62–7 
| 
|-
| 
| style="| 
| style="| Packers  29–27
| style="| Packers  28–6
| Packers  76–62–7 
| 
|-
| 
| style="| 
| style="| Packers  37–31
| style="| Packers  40–14
| Packers  78–62–7 
| Lions open Ford Field.
|-
| 
| Tie 1–1
| style="| Lions  22–14
| style="| Packers  31–6
| Packers  79–63–7 
| 
|-
| 
| style="| 
| style="| Packers  38–10
| style="| Packers  16–13
| Packers  81–63–7 
| 
|-
| 
| Tie 1–1
| style="| Lions  17–3
| style="| Packers  16–13(OT)
| Packers  82–64–7 
| 
|-
| 
| style="| 
| style="| Packers  31–24
| style="| Packers  17–9
| Packers  84–64–7
| 
|-
| 
| style="| 
| style="| Packers  37–26
| style="| Packers  34–13
| Packers  86–64–7
| 
|-
| 
| style="| 
| style="| Packers  48–25
| style="| Packers  31–21
| Packers  88–64–7
| Lions complete first 0–16 season in NFL history.  Packers' win in Green Bay was the final game of the season to clinch the Lions' winless season.
|-
| 
| style="| 
| style="| Packers  34–12
| style="| Packers  26–0
| Packers  90–64–7
| 
|-

|-
| 
| Tie 1–1
| style="| Lions  7–3
| style="| Packers  28–26
| Packers  91–65–7 
| Packers win 10 straight meetings (2005–10), Packers win Super Bowl XLV.
|-
| 
| style="| 
| style="| Packers  27–15
| style="| Packers  45–41
| Packers  93–65–7
| Packers' backup QB Matt Flynn throws for a team record six touchdowns in the game in Green Bay.  The 45–41 score was the highest total score in the history of the series (86 points).
|-
| 
| style="| 
| style="| Packers  24–20
| style="| Packers  27–20
| Packers  95–65–7
| 
|-
| 
| Tie 1–1
| style="| Lions  40–10
| style="| Packers  22–9
| Packers  96–66–7 
| 
|-
| 
| Tie 1–1
| style="| Lions  19–7
| style="| Packers  30–20
| Packers  97–67–7 
| Packers win final game of the regular season in Green Bay to clinch NFC North title and a first-round bye (Lions and Packers entered tied atop the division).  Packers win 25 straight home meetings.
|-
| 
| Tie 1–1
| style="| Packers  27–23
| style="| Lions  18–16
| Packers  98–68–7 
| Lions win in Green Bay for the first time since 1991.  Packers win in Detroit on a 61 yard Hail Mary touchdown pass from Aaron Rodgers to Richard Rodgers II with no time remaining.
|-
| 
| style="| 
| style="| Packers  31–24
| style="| Packers  34–27
| Packers  100–68–7
| Packers become the first team in NFL history to beat a single opponent 100 times. Packers clinch NFC North in Detroit in week 17.
|-
| 
| style="| 
| style="| Lions  35–11
| style="| Lions  30–17
| Packers  100–70–7
| Lions sweep the season series for the first time since 1991.
|-
| 
| style="| 
| style="| Lions  31–23
| style="| Lions  31–0
| Packers  100–72–7
|
|-
| 
| style="| 
| style="| Packers  23–20
| style="| Packers  23–22
| Packers  102–72–7
| Packers come back from down 13–0 in Green Bay and 17–3 in Detroit to win both meetings. Packers clinch first-round bye in game in Detroit.
|-

|-
| 
| style="| 
| style="| Packers  31–24
| style="| Packers  42–21
| Packers  104–72–7
| Packers clinch NFC North division title with win in Detroit.
|-
| 
| Tie 1–1
| style="| Lions  37–30
| style="| Packers  35–17
| Packers  105–73–7
| 
|-
| 
| style="| 
| style="| Lions  15–9
| style="| Lions  20–16
| Packers  105–75–7
| The Lions' Week 18 win in Green Bay eliminated the Packers from playoff contention.
|- 

|-
| Regular season
| style="|
| 
| 
| Packers home record includes 47–25–3 in Green Bay and 14–3–1 in Milwaukee
|-
| Postseason
| style="|Packers 2–0
| Packers 1–0
| Packers 1–0
| NFC Wild Card Round: 1993, 1994
|-
| Regular and postseason 
| style="|
| 
| 
| 
|-

See also
Other rivalries involving the two teams:
Bears–Lions rivalry
Bears–Packers rivalry
Lions–Vikings rivalry
Packers–Vikings rivalry

References
NFL.com All-Time Team vs. Team Results
mcubed.net's Lions-Packers Series History 1966–present

Detroit Lions
Green Bay Packers rivalries
National Football League rivalries
Detroit Lions rivalries